Alev may refer to:

Alev  is a Turkish given name (meaning flame) for females. People named Alev include:
 Alev Alatlı, Turkish  economist, philosopher, columnist  and bestselling novelist
 Alev Croutier, Internationally acclaimed writer based in San Francisco
 Alev Demirkesen, Turkish artist
 Alev Erisir, Turkish-American academic in Psychology
 Alev Kelter, United States international rugby player
 Alev Korun, Turkish-Austrian politician
 Alev Lenz, German-Turkish singer/songwriter
Alev is also a type of settlement in Estonia (Urban-type settlement like), that is on a lower level than a town or city. The name means "borough". It is larger than an alevik (small borough). There are twelve alevs in Estonia.
 

Turkish feminine given names